Sport London e Benfica are a football club, based in London. The club is affiliated with Sport Lisboa e Benfica.

History
Founded on 15 May 1981, the club joined the Camden Sunday League, where they remained until joining the Chiswick & District League in 1986. In 1990 they joined the Marathon Sunday League, going on to win Division Three in 1995–96 and Division Two in 1997–98. After finishing as runners-up in Division One in 1998–99, the club were promoted to the Premier Division. In 2000 they became members of the Hayes & District Sunday League, winning the Premier Division in 2002–03. The following season they won the league's Premier Cup and President Cup.

In 2005 the club switched from Sunday league football to Saturday football, joining Division One of the Middlesex County Football League. The club won the division at the first attempt, earning promotion to the Premier Division. The following season the club won the Premier Division, earning promotion to Division One of the Spartan South Midlands League.

In 2007–08 the club finished eighth in Division One. The following season they dropped to eighteenth place, and played in the FA Vase for the first time, reaching the second round. In 2009–10 they finished twentieth in a 21-club division. During the following season the club's groundshare with Hanwell Town ended and they moved to Haringey Borough's Coles Park in Tottenham. As a result, the club resigned from the league midway through the season.

The club continued to run youth teams, also creating a futsal team that entered the Middlesex FA Futsal fives, which they went on to win two seasons in a row.

Honours
Middlesex County League
Premier Division champions 2006–07
Division One champions 2005–06
Hayes & District Sunday League
Premier Division champions 2002–03
Premier Cup winners 2003–04
President's Cup winners 2003–04
Marathon Sunday League
Division Two winners 1997–98
Division Three winners 1995–96

Records
FA Vase
Second Round 2008–09

References

External links
Official website

Football clubs in England
Football clubs in London
Association football clubs established in 1981
1981 establishments in England
London
Middlesex County Football League
Spartan South Midlands Football League
Diaspora association football clubs in England